Al-Mansurah, formerly Khanshaleelah is a residential neighborhood and a subject of Baladiyah al-Batha and Baladiyah al-Aziziya in southern Riyadh, Saudi Arabia. Spanned across 5.89 square kilometers, it is bordered by Manfuhah neighborhood to the west, al-Khalidiyyah neighborhood to the east and al-Oud neighborhood to the north.

History 
According to historians, the neighborhood's previous name, Khanshaleelah was derived from the name of a woman, Jaleelah, the daughter of Abdul Mohsen bin Sai'id ad-Dar'iy al-Hanafyy, who reportedly donated her house to feed and accommodate Hajj pilgrims passing through Riyadh from east.

References 

Neighbourhoods in Riyadh